The Dublin Civic Trust is an architectural conservation and educational organisation founded in 1991 that works to identify, record, preserve and publicise Dublin's architectural heritage. The trust also comments and assists to a lesser extent with other buildings outside of Dublin.

The trust regularly appears in national print media lobbying on conservation and architectural heritage issues as well as contributing annual budget submissions.

List of completed building conservation projects
 4 Castle Street, Dublin 2
 18 Ormond Quay Upper, Inns Quay, Dublin 7, D07 V027 - winner of a 2021 Europa Nostra Award
 21 Aungier Street, Dublin 2
 10 and 11 South Frederick Street, Dublin 2
 2 St. Andrew Street, Dublin 2
 27 Pearse Street
 9 Merchant's Quay

See also
 Irish Georgian Society
 An Taisce
 Irish Landmark Trust
 Development and preservation in Dublin
 Conservation in the Republic of Ireland
 Heritage Council (Ireland)
 National Trust
 Industrial Heritage Association of Ireland
 Waterways Ireland
 National Museum of Ireland
 Limerick Civic Trust

References

Conservation in the Republic of Ireland
Cultural heritage of Ireland
National trusts
Archaeological organizations
Non-profit organisations based in the Republic of Ireland
1991 establishments in Ireland